We'll Take Her Children in Amongst Our Own was a 1915 film directed by Raymond Longford based on a narrative poem by Victor Hugo. It was released in support of The Sunny South or The Whirlwind of Fate (1915). It is considered a lost film.

References

External links

1915 films
Australian silent short films
Lost Australian films
Films based on poems
Films directed by Raymond Longford
Australian black-and-white films
Films based on works by Victor Hugo